Everything's Ducky is a 1961 comedy film directed by Don Taylor and written by Benedict Freedman and John Fenton Murray. The film stars Mickey Rooney, Buddy Hackett, Jackie Cooper, Joanie Sommers, Roland Winters and Elizabeth MacRae. The film was released on December 20, 1961, by Columbia Pictures.

Plot
Two sailors sneak a talking duck aboard their ship. Complications ensue. The duck waddles all over the ship until he escapes.

Cast
Mickey Rooney as Kermit 'Beetle' McKay
Buddy Hackett as Seaman Admiral John Paul 'Ad' Jones
Jackie Cooper as Lt. J.S. Parmell 
Joanie Sommers as Nina Lloyd
Roland Winters as Capt. Lewis Bollinger
Elizabeth MacRae as Susie Penrose
Gene Blakely as Lt. Cmdr. Bernard Kemp
Gordon Jones as Chief Petty Officer Conroy
Richard Deacon as Dr. Deckham
James Millhollin as George Imhoff 
Jimmy Cross as Drunk
Robert Williams as Duck Hunter
King Calder as Frank 
Ellie Kent as Nurse 
William Hellinger as Corpsman
Ann Morell as Wave
George Sawaya as Simmons
Dick Winslow as Fröehlich
Alvy Moore as Jim Lipscott
Walker Edmiston as Scuttlebutt – The Duck

References

External links
 
 

1961 films
1961 comedy films
1961 directorial debut films
American comedy films
Military humor in film
Talking animals in fiction
Films about the United States Navy
Films about ducks
Films set on ships
Films directed by Don Taylor
Columbia Pictures films
1960s English-language films
1960s American films